The Pelican Point Lighthouse is a lighthouse overlooking the Atlantic Ocean from Pelican Point, a long sandbar guarding Walvis Bay, Namibia. It was opened by the South African government in 1932. The round, cast-iron, 34-meter-high tower features a lantern and gallery and is painted in horizontal black and white bands.

References

External links 
 Official tourist website

 Lighthouses in Namibia
Buildings and structures in Walvis Bay
Lighthouses completed in 1932
1932 establishments in South West Africa